Tobias Patrick Robinson (born 22 August 1996) is an English international swimmer. He has represented England at the Commonwealth Games.

Biography
Robinson trains out of Loughborough University and competed in the Open water swimming at the 2022 World Aquatics Championships – Men's 10 km where he finished in 21st place. In 2022, he also won a silver medal behind Daniel Jervis in the 1500m freestyle event at the 2022 British Swimming Championships.

In 2022, he was selected for the 2022 Commonwealth Games in Birmingham where he competed in the men's 400 metre freestyle, finishing in 10th place and the men's 1500 metre freestyle. Robinson joined the team following the withdrawal of Max Litchfield.

References

1996 births
Living people
English male swimmers
British male swimmers
Swimmers at the 2022 Commonwealth Games
Commonwealth Games competitors for England
Competitors at the 2017 Summer Universiade
20th-century English people
21st-century English people